The FIVB Senior Continental Rankings is a ranking system for men's and women's national teams in volleyball. Divided to five continental confederations, the teams of the member nations of FIVB, volleyball's world governing body, are ranked based on their game results with the most successful teams being ranked highest. A points system is used, with points being awarded based on the results of all FIVB-recognised full international matches. The rankings are used in international competitions to define the seeded teams and arrange them in pools. Specific procedures for seeding and pooling are established by the FIVB in each competition's formula, but the method usually employed is the serpentine system.

Calculation method

In 2019, FIVB collaborated with Hypercube Business Innovation of the Netherlands to design a new world ranking platform. The previous calculation method have a problem of circularity in the international volleyball calendar: only countries who participate in the major volleyball events can earn ranking points, whilst the number of ranking points of countries also determines seeding and access of teams for major events. This unfair principle does not contribute to the sporting and commercial quality of volleyball.

On 1 February 2020, the new ranking system will be implemented and will take into account all results from 1 January 2019. The system will be consistently updated to reflect the latest results and performances. The new World Ranking considers the match results between teams in the same continental confederations from all official competitions:

AVC Continental Rankings

Top ranked men's national teams

Top ranked women's national teams

CAVB Continental Rankings

Top ranked men's national teams

Top ranked women's national teams

CEV Continental Rankings

Top ranked men's national teams

Top ranked women's national teams

CSV Continental Rankings

Top ranked men's national teams

Top ranked women's national teams

NORCECA Continental Rankings

Top ranked men's national teams

Top ranked women's national teams

References

World Rankings
Volleyball-related lists
Sports world rankings